Baron Remnant, of Wenhaston in the County of Suffolk, is a title in the Peerage of the United Kingdom. It was created on 26 June 1928 for the Conservative politician Sir James Remnant, 1st Baronet, who had previously represented Holborn in the House of Commons. He had already been created a Baronet, of Wenhaston in the County of Suffolk, on 14 July 1917.  the titles are held by his great-grandson, the fourth Baron, who succeeded his father in that year.

Remnant Baronets, of Wenhaston (1917)
Sir James Farquharson Remnant, 1st Baronet (1862-1933)
See Barons Remnant for further Remnant Baronets, of Wenhaston.

Barons Remnant (1928)
James Farquharson Remnant, 1st Baron Remnant (1862–1933)
Robert John Farquharson Remnant, 2nd Baron Remnant (1895–1967)
James Wogan Remnant, 3rd Baron Remnant (1930–2022)
Philip John Remnant, 4th Baron Remnant (b. 1954)

The heir apparent is the present holder's only son, Hon. Edward James Remnant (b. 1981)
The heir apparent's heir apparent is his son, Theodore Philip Noel Remnant (b. 2014).

References

References
 Kidd, Charles, Williamson, David (editors). Debrett's Peerage and Baronetage (1990 edition). New York: St Martin's Press, 1990, 
 

Baronies in the Peerage of the United Kingdom
Baronetcies in the Baronetage of the United Kingdom
Noble titles created in 1928
Noble titles created in 1917
Noble titles created for UK MPs